Queen Insun (인순왕후 심씨; 27 June 1532 – 12 February 1575), of the Cheongsong Sim clan, was a posthumous name bestowed to the wife and queen consort of Yi Hwan, King Myeongjong. She was queen consort of Joseon from 1545 until her husband's death in 1567, after which she was honoured as Queen Dowager Uiseong (의성왕대비). She served as regent of Korea during the minority of her adoptive son, king Yi Yeon, King Seonjo, from 1567 until 1568.

Biography

Early life 
Lady Sim was born on 27 June 1532 to Sim Kang and Lady Yi of the Jeonju Yi clan. She is the eldest within 10 siblings, including Sim Ui-gyeom. Through her mother, she is a 6th great-granddaughter of Queen Wongyeong and King Taejong; through her 5th great-grandfather, Grand Prince Hyoryeong.

Marriage 
In April 1542, Lady Sim was arranged to marry Grand Prince Gyeongwon; the only son of King Jungjong and Queen Munjeong. Lady Sim was given the title of Princess Consort (부부인).

Queen 
In 1545, when King Injong passed away, her husband was enthroned as the next king of joseon as there wasn't any heirs from Queen Inseong. The Princess Consort then became the next Queen Consort and had a son, Crown Prince Sunhoe, in 1551.

The Crown Prince died in 1563; leaving no heirs from King Myeongjong who also died in 1567. This left Prince Haseong (the future King Seonjo), a son of Grand Internal Prince Deokheung and Grand Internal Princess Consort Hadong, to become the next crowned prince.

Regency and later life 
The Queen Consort became Queen Regent in 1567 upon on the prince's enthronement as king because he was young. In 1568, she stepped down as regent and became Queen Dowager. She was later given the title of Uiseong (의성, 懿聖) in 1569.

Her reign as Queen Dowager lasted 8 years as she died on 12 February 1575 within Changgyeong Palace's Tongmyeong Hall. Nearby where her mother-in-law, Queen Munjeong, is buried, the Queen is buried with her husband in Kangreung.

Trivia 
Queen Insun eventually became the 5th great-grandaunt of Queen Danui, King Gyeongjong's first wife. She is also a 4th great-granddaughter of Sim On and a 3rd great-grandniece of Queen Soheon, King Sejong's wife.

Family
Parent

 Father − Sim Kang (1514 – 1567) (심강,  沈鋼)
 1) Grandfather − Sim Yeon-won (심연원, 沈連源) (1491 - 1558)
 2) Great-Grandfather − Sim Sun-mun (심순문, 沈順門)
 3) Great-Great-Grandfather - Sim Won (심원, 沈湲)
 4) Great-Great-Great-Grandfather - Sim Hoe (심회, 沈澮) (1418 - 1493); younger brother of Queen Soheon
 5) Great-Great-Great-Great-Grandfather - Sim On (심온, 沈溫) (1375 – 18 January 1419); father of Queen Soheon
 5) Great-Great-Great-Great-Grandmother - Internal Princess Consort Sunheung of the Sunheung Ahn clan (순흥부부인 안씨) (? - 1444)
 4) Great-Great-Great-Grandmother - Lady Kim of the Wonju Kim clan (정경부인 원주 김씨, 貞敬夫人 原州 金氏) 
 3) Great-Great-Grandmother - Lady Yi of the Jeonju Yi clan (증 정경부인 전주 이씨)
 2) Great-Grandmother − Lady Shin of the Pyeongsan Shin clan (증 정경부인 평산 신씨, 贈 貞敬夫人 平山 申氏)
 1) Grandmother − Lady Kim of the Gyeongju Kim clan (정경부인 경주 김씨, 貞敬夫人 慶州 金氏) (1485 - 1564); daughter of Kim Dang (김당, 金璫)
 Mother − Yi Hui-gyeong, Internal Princess Consort Wansan of the Jeonju Yi clan (1511 – 1559) (이희경 완산부부인 전주 이씨, 李希慶 完山府夫人 全州 李氏)
 1) Grandfather − Yi Dae, Prince Jeonseong (전성군 이대) (21 July 1488 - 29 October 1543)
 2) Grandmother − Lady Jeong of the Dongrae Jeong clan (동래 정씨) (? - 9 January 1557)

Sibling

 Younger brother − Sim In-gyeom (심인겸, 沈仁謙) (June 1533 - 17 November 1580)
 Sister-in-law − Lady Yi (이씨); daughter of Yi Bal (이발)
 Nephew − Sim Eom (심엄, 沈㤿) (1563 - 1609); became the adoptive son of Sim Ui-gyeom
 Niece-in-law - Gu Gyeong-wan (구경완, 具敬婉), Lady Gu of the Neungseong Gu clan (1563 - 1620); Queen Inheon’s older sister
 Grandnephew - Sim Gwang-se (심광세, 沈光世) (1577 - 1624)
 Grandnephew - Sim Jeong-se (심정세, 沈挺世) (1579 - 1613)
 Grandniece-in-law - Lady Kim of the Yeonan Kim clan (1581 - 1604); Queen Inmok’s older sister 
 Grandniece - Lady Sim (1585 - 1658)
 Grandnephew-in-law - Yi Sik (이식, 李植) of the Deoksu Yi clan (1584 - 1647)
 Grandnephew - Sim Myeong-se (심명세, 沈命世) (1587 - 1632)
 Grandnephew - Sim Jang-se (심장세, 沈長世) (1594 - 1660)
 Grandnephew - Sim Ahn-se (심안세, 沈安世) (1598 - 1616)
 Grandnephew - Sim Pil-se (심필세, 沈弼世)
 Grandnephew - Sim Hui-se (심희세, 沈凞世) (1601 - 1645); became the adoptive son of Sim Yeol
 Grandniece - Lady Sim
 Grandnephew-in-law - Yun Jun (유준)
 Grandniece - Lady Sim
 Grandnephew-in-law - Seong Yeo-yong (성여용)
 Grandniece - Lady Sim
 Grandnephew-in-law - Yi Seung-hyeong (이승형)
 Younger brother − Sim Ui-gyeom (심의겸, 沈義謙) (1535 - 1587)
 Sister-in-law − Han Eun-hak (한은학, 韓恩鶴), Lady Han of the Cheongju Han clan (정부인 청주 한씨, 貞夫人 淸州 韓氏) (1532 - ?); daughter of Han Heung-seo (한흥서)
 Nephew − Shim Non (심논, 沈惀) (1562 - ?)
 Niece-in-law - Lady Yu of the Munhwa Yu clan (문화 유씨)
 Grandnephew - Sim Ik-se (심익세, 沈翼世)
 Niece − Sim Suk-shin (심숙신, 沈淑愼), Lady Sim of the Cheongsong Sim clan (1574 - 1648)
 Nephew-in-law - Yun Hwan (윤훤, 尹暄) (1573 - 15 February 1627); Yun Doo-su’s youngest son
 Grandnephew - Yun Sun-ji (윤순지, 尹順之) (1591 - 1666)
 Grandniece-in-law - Lady Park of the Bannam Park clan (반남 박씨) (1589 - 1658)
 Grandnephew - Yun Won-ji (윤원지, 尹元之) (1596 - 1641)
 Grandniece-in-law - Lady Oh of the Dongbok Oh clan (동복 오씨)
 Grandnephew - Yun Jing-ji (윤징지, 尹澄之) (1601 - 1663)
 Grandniece-in-law - Lady Ryu of the Munhwa Ryu clan (문화 류씨)
 Grandniece-in-law - Lady Kwon of the Andong Kwon clan (안동 권씨)
 Great-Grandnephew - Yun Jeon (윤전, 尹塼); became the adoptive son of Yun Sun-ji
 Grandnephew - Yun Ui-ji (윤의지, 尹誼之) (1605 - 1666)
 Grandniece-in-law - Lady Yi of the Goseong Yi clan (고성 이씨) (? - 1647)
 Grandniece - Lady Yun of the Haepyeong Yun clan (해평 윤씨)
 Grandnephew-in-law - Shin Myeon (신면, 申冕) (1607 - 1652)
 Younger brother − Sim Ye-gyeom (심예겸, 沈禮謙) (1537 - 1578)
 Sister-in-law − Lady Jeong of the Yeonil Jeong clan (연일 정씨)
 Adoptive Nephew − Sim Yeol (심열, 沈悅) (1569 - 1646)
 Younger brother − Sim Ji-gyeom (심지겸, 沈智謙) (1540 - 1568)
 Sister-in-law − Lady Lee (이씨) 
 Sister-in-law − Lady Heo (허씨)
 Nephew − Sim Gyeong (심경, 沈憬)
 Younger brother − Sim Shin-gyeom (심신겸, 沈信謙) (1542 - 1596)
 Sister-in-law − Lady Jeong (정씨); daughter of Jeong In-su (정인수)
 Nephew − Sim Yul (심율, 沈慄)
 Nephew − Sim Gak (심각, 沈恪)
 Nephew − Sim Yi (심이, 沈怡)
 Niece − Lady Sim
 Nephew-in-law - Yu Hui-bal (유희발)
 Niece − Lady Sim; Jeong Yu-gil’s first wife
 Nephew-in-law - Jeong Yu-gil (정유길, 鄭惟吉) of the Dongrae Jeong clan (30 November 1515 - 28 September 1588)
 Step-grandniece - Jeong Yang-jeong, Internal Princess Consort Bongwon of the Dongrae Jeong clan (정양정 봉원부부인 동래 정씨, 鄭楊貞 蓬原府夫人 東萊 鄭氏) (1541 - 1620)
 Step Great-Grandniece - Queen Hyejang of the Munhwa Yu clan (혜장왕후 유씨) (15 August 1576 – 31 October 1623)
 Niece − Lady Sim
 Nephew-in-law - Jeong Seon-geon (정선건)
 Niece − Lady Sim
 Nephew-in-law - Jeong Jung-gil (정종길)
 Younger brother − Sim Chong-gyeom (심충겸, 沈忠謙) (1545 - 1594)
 Sister-in-law − Lady Yi of the Jeonju Yi clan (증 정경부인 전주 이씨)
 Nephew − Sim Heun (심흔, 沈忻)
 Nephew − Sim Yeol (심열, 沈悅) (1569 - 1646); became the adoptive son of Shim Ye-gyeom
 Niece-in-law - Lady Nam of the Uiryeong Nam clan (의령 남씨)
 Niece-in-law - Lady Yu of the Gigye Yu clan (기계 유씨)
 Nephew − Sim Jong (심종, 沈悰)
 Niece − Lady Sim
 Nephew-in-law - Jo Yeong (조영)
 Niece − Lady Sim
 Nephew-in-law - Yi Myeon (이면)
 Younger brother − Sim Hyo-gyeom (심효겸, 沈孝謙) (20 September 1547 - 24 September 1600)
 Sister-in-law − Lady Nam (남씨); daughter of Nam Eung-seo (남응서)
 Sister-in-law − Lady Yi (이씨); daughter of Yi Gyeong (이경)
 Nephew − Sim Pib (심핍, 沈愊)
 Nephew − Sim Cheok (심척, 沈惕)
 Niece − Lady Sim 
 Nephew-in-law - Kim Su (김수)
 Niece − Lady Sim
 Nephew-in-law - Yi Pil-su (이필수)
 Younger brother − Sim Je-gyeom (심제겸, 沈悌謙) (1550 - 1589)
 Sister-in-law − Lady Shin (신씨); daughter of Shin Sa-won (신사원)
 Nephew − Sim Yu (심유, 沈愉)
 Nephew − Sim Hyeob (심협, 沈協)
 Niece − Lady Sim
 Nephew-in-law - Yun Gong (윤공, 尹珙)
 Niece − Lady Sim 
 Nephew-in-law - Jeong Du-won (정두원)
 Niece − Lady Sim
 Nephew-in-law - Hwang Jib (황집)
 Younger sister − Lady Sim (청송 심씨)
 Brother-in-law − Im Yeong-ro (임영로, 任榮老) of the Pungcheon Im clan (풍천 임씨) (1540 - ?)
 Younger sister − Lady Sim (청송 심씨)
 Brother-in-law − Yi Byeok (이벽, 李鼊) of the Jeonju Yi clan (전주 이씨); son of Yi Deok-su, Prince Suwon (수원군 이덕수)

Consort and Issue
Husband - Myeongjong of Joseon (3 July 1534 – 3 August 1567) (조선명종)
Son - Yi Bu, Crown Prince Sunhoe (1 July 1551 – 6 October 1563) (이부 순회세자)  
Daughter-in-law - Crown Princess Gonghoe of the Musong Yun clan (1550 – 14 April 1592) (공회빈 윤씨)
Adoptive son - Seonjo of Joseon (조선선조) (26 November 1552 - 16 March 1608)
Adoptive daughter-in-law - Queen Uiin of the Bannam Park clan (의인왕후 박씨) (5 May 1555 - 5 August 1600)
Adoptive daughter-in-law - Queen Inmok of the Yeonan Kim clan (인목왕후 김씨) (15 December 1584 - 13 August 1632)
 Adoptive granddaughter - Princess Jeongmyeong (정명공주) (27 June 1603 – 8 September 1685)
 Unnamed adoptive granddaughter (1604); died prematurely 
 Adoptive grandson - Yi Ui, Grand Prince Yeongchang (이의 영창대군) (12 April 1606 – 19 March 1614)

In popular culture
 Portrayed by Jang Hee-jin in the 2016 JTBC TV series Mirror of the Witch.

References

Notes

16th-century Korean people
1532 births
1575 deaths
Regents of Korea
Royal consorts of the Joseon dynasty
Korean queens consort
16th-century women rulers